Grasshopper Club Zürich, commonly referred to as simply GC, GCZ, or Grasshoppers, is a multisports club based in Zürich, Switzerland and its football division is the most successful club in Switzerland, with a record 27 league titles, a record 19 cup championships, eight doubles, two league cup wins, and one Super Cup victory. 

GC has to date never won any European championship, but has competed in numerous European cups throughout its existence. Despite the lack of international success, the team has made waves on some occasions with victories over teams such as Ajax Amsterdam or the Glasgow Rangers.

Best Placements

{| class="wikitable" style="text-align:left"
|-
!Competition
!Year
!Stage Reached
!Last Opponent
|-
|rowspan=2|UEFA Champions League
|1996-97
|Group Stage (3rd)
| Auxerre,  Ajax,  Rangers
|-
|1995-96
|Group Stage (4th)
| Ajax,  Real Madrid,  Ferencváros
|-
|rowspan=2|European Cup
|1978-79
|Quarter-finals
| Nottingham Forest 
|-
|1984–85
|Round of 16
| Juventus 
|-
|rowspan=4|UEFA Cup
|1977-78
|Semi-finals
| Bastia 
|-
|1980-81
|Quarter-final
| Sochaux 
|-
|1979-80
|Round of 16
| Stuttgart 
|-
|1998-99
|Round of 16
| Bordeaux 
|-
|European Cup Winners' Cup
|1989-90
|Quarter-finals
| Sampdoria
|-
|UEFA Cup Winners' Cup
|1994-95
|Round of 16
| Sampdoria

Detailed Results

1956-1970

1970-1980

1980-1990

1990-2000

2000-2020

References and Notes

External Links
 Palmares

Grasshopper Club Zürich
Swiss football clubs in international competitions